Alastair Blair Worden, FBA (born 12 January 1945), usually cited as Blair Worden, is a historian, among the leading authorities on the period of the English Civil War and on relations between literature and history more generally in the early modern period.

Education and career
He matriculated as an undergraduate at Pembroke College, Oxford, in 1963. After spending a year as a visiting student at Harvard he began graduate research at Oxford in 1967. After a period as a Fellow of St Edmund Hall, Oxford, teaching History, he took up a position as a Professor at  Royal Holloway, University of London. In 1997 he was elected a Fellow of the British Academy, and in 1999 he delivered the British Academy's Raleigh Lecture on History. As of 2011 he is an Emeritus Fellow of St Edmund Hall. He is well known for his revolutionary article "Oliver Cromwell and the Sin of Achan", which changed established historical perceptions about what exactly caused Oliver Cromwell to reject the offer of the Crown.

Books

 The Rump Parliament 1648–53 (1974); 1977 pbk edition
 (ed.) Edmund Ludlow: A Voyce from the Watchtower (1978)
 (ed.) History and Imagination: essays in honour of H. R. Trevor-Roper (1981)
 (ed.) Stuart England (1986)
 The Sound of Virtue: Philip Sidney's Arcadia and Elizabethan politics (1996)
 Roundhead reputations: the English Civil Wars and the passions of posterity (2001)
 Literature and politics in Cromwellian England: John Milton, Andrew Marvell, Marchamont Nedham (2007)
 The English Civil Wars 1640–1660 (2010); ebook
 God's Instruments: Political Conduct in the England of Oliver Cromwell (2012)

Selected articles and chapters

 "The Commonwealth Kidney of Algernon Sidney", Journal of British Studies, 24 (1985), 1–40 
 "Andrew Marvell, Oliver Cromwell and the Horatian ode", in Politics of Discourse: The literature and history of seventeenth-century England, ed. Kevin Sharpe and Steven N. Zwicker (Berkeley: University of California Press, 1987), pp. 147–80
 "Cromwellian Oxford", in The History of the University of Oxford, ed. Nicholas Tyacke (Oxford: Clarendon Press, 1997), pp. 733–72
 "The Question of Secularization", in A Nation Transformed: England after the Restoration, ed. Alan Houston and Stephen Pincus (Cambridge: Cambridge University Press, 2001), pp. 20–40
 "Oliver Cromwell and the Protectorate", Transactions of the Royal Historical Society, 6th ser., 20 (2010), 57–84 
 "Oliver Cromwell and the Sin of Achan", in Cromwell and the Interregnum: The Essential Readings, ed. D. L. Smith (Oxford: Blackwell, 2008), pp. 37–60

References

External links
 Worden author page and article archive from The New York Review of Books
 A life in writing: Blair Worden

Living people
British historians
1945 births
Alumni of Pembroke College, Oxford
Fellows of St Edmund Hall, Oxford